Smashing Anthems is the eleventh studio album released by Japanese voice actress and pop singer Nana Mizuki on November 11, 2015. Recording sessions for the album took place from 2014 to 2015. It was released in three editions: a CD only edition, a limited CD+DVD edition and a limited CD+BD edition.

Track listing

References

External links
 Information on official website

2015 albums
Nana Mizuki albums